H63 or H-63 may refer to:

 H-63 KingCobra helicopter prototype
 H-63 (Michigan county highway)
 Nelson H-63 two stroke aircraft engine
 HMS Gipsy (H63), a British destroyer